1-Methylcytosine is a methylated form of the DNA base cytosine.

In 1-methylcytosine, a methyl group is attached to the 1st atom in the 6-atom ring. This methyl group distinguishes 1-methylcytosine from cytosine.

History 
Miriam Rossi worked on the refinement of 1-methylcytosine.

1-Methylcytosine is used as a nucleobase of hachimoji DNA, in which it pairs with isoguanine.

References 

Nucleobases
Pyrimidones